Group A of the 2012 Fed Cup Americas Zone Group II was one of two pools in the Americas zone of the 2012 Fed Cup. Five teams competed in a round robin competition, with the teams proceeding to their respective sections of the play-offs: the top two teams played for advancement to the 2013 Group I.

Guatemala vs. Dominican Republic

Ecuador vs. Trinidad and Tobago

Guatemala vs. Ecuador

Trinidad and Tobago vs. Dominican Republic

Guatemala vs. Trinidad and Tobago

Ecuador vs. Dominican Republic

See also
Fed Cup structure

References

External links
 Fed Cup website

2012 Fed Cup Americas Zone